Sharpe's Siege is a British television drama, the tenth of a series that follows the career of Richard Sharpe, a British soldier during the Napoleonic Wars. The adaptation is based on the 1987 novel of the same name by Bernard Cornwell.

Plot summary

In 1813, the war turns in favour of the British. Lord Wellington is poised to invade southern France after triumphing in Spain. The Comte de Maquerre, a French nobleman, offers to raise a rebellion in Bordeaux against Napoleon. Wellington's intelligence chief, Major General Ross, is unconvinced, as his spies have reported no discontent in the region, but agrees that a brigade can be sent as a probe if the comte can provide a secure base; he offers a family castle, though he admits that it is garrisoned.

Wellington is forced to put a young, inexperienced Colonel Horace Bampfylde (the son of a general Wellington needs to placate) in charge of the expedition, instead of Major Sharpe. Sharpe is reluctant to go, as he has just married Jane Gibbons and she has come down with a deadly fever. Without quinine, her prognosis is bleak, but he is a soldier and he has his orders.

Bampfylde botches the initial assault on the fortress and is driven back with heavy casualties. Disgusted, Sharpe and his men gain entry to the castle at night by a ruse, pretending to be a French patrol bringing in a seriously wounded soldier, and capture the place easily. The comte is reunited with his sister and gravely ill mother. Bampfylde sends Sharpe on a useless reconnaissance in order to grab the credit for himself.

While Sharpe is away, the comte brings the "mayor of a nearby town" to Bampfylde who confirms that Bordeaux is ripe for rebellion; however, the comte is in league with Napoleon, and the mayor is in fact Napoleon's agent, and Sharpe's bitter enemy, Major Ducos. Ducos also tells Bampfylde that Sharpe was ambushed and killed by a French column. Convinced that his mission is a success and seeing no further reason to stay, Bampfylde is convinced by the comte to demolish the front gates, blow up the captured ammunition, abandon the wounded, and return to Wellington immediately with the good news.

Sharpe's patrol ambushes and annihilates a French column of reinforcements, capturing a resupply cart and a doctor bringing quinine for the comte's mother. Resisting the temptation to save it for his wife, Sharpe allows it to be administered to the ailing woman.

One of Sharpe's men, Rifleman Robinson, is found with a local French girl. Sharpe is required to hang him by Wellington's standing order, but when the girl says she had been willing, Sharpe reduces the sentence to a beating from Sergeant Harper. During the incident, they question the locals and find them fiercely loyal to Napoleon, making them suspicious of the comte's claims that the region is ripe for rebellion.

Hearing the explosion from the castle's magazine, Sharpe and his men hurry back. When he gets a description of the mayor, he realises he has been trapped by Major Ducos. Not only will Wellington be tricked into advancing into an ambush, but Ducos will have his own personal revenge on Sharpe.

French General Calvet arrives with a sizable, but inexperienced, force. Under a flag of truce, the comte reveals himself to be Napoleon's agent, and offers to let the British go free, provided that they leave Sharpe behind; Robinson replies for them all, "Fight them to the finish, sir." Sharpe turns them down. Sharpshooters mortally wound the comte in the back at long range as he returns from the parley.

Sharpe and his men only have 18 rounds each due to the destruction of the ammunition. Earlier, out of gratitude for Sharpe providing her mother with quinine, the comte's sister had told them to burn a cellar full of oyster shells to produce lime. The French attack, but are met by accurate volley fire. With the British ammunition running low, Sharpe's men dump powdered lime from the walls, blinding their foes as they break into the castle. The British proceed to massacre the helpless Frenchmen. The beaten French retreat just as the British run out of ammunition. A messenger arrives at Calvet's camp from Marshal Soult, Calvet's superior, demanding to know why he was not guarding the flank when Wellington attacked ... fifty miles away. The wily British commander had been suspicious, so he attacked elsewhere. General Calvet hurries away, leaving Sharpe victorious.

When Sharpe gets back, Bampfylde is placed under arrest for cowardice and other charges. Sharpe is astounded to find his wife well; she tells him that Wellington had gone to some lengths to obtain quinine for her.

Cast
 Sean Bean – Major Richard Sharpe
 Daragh O'Malley – Sergeant Major Patrick Harper
 Abigail Cruttenden – Jane Gibbons
 Hugh Fraser – Lord Wellington
 James Laurenson – Major General Ross
 Féodor Atkine – Major Pierre Ducos
  – Comte de Maquerre
 Christopher Villiers – Colonel Horace Bampfylde
 Amira Casar – Catherine
 Philip Whitchurch – Capt. William Frederickson
 James Ryland – Capt. Neil Palmer
 Olivier Pierre – General Calvet
 Danny Cunningham – Rifleman Robinson
 Sylvester Morand – Colonel Henri Lassan
 John Tams – Rifleman Daniel Hagman
 Jason Salkey – Rifleman Harris
 John Tordoff – Dr. Kenefick
 Jim McManus – Smithers
 J.D. Kelleher – Rifleman Reilly
 Nicola Murray – Brigitte
 Stéphane Cornicard – French Colonel
 Diana Perez – Ramona

External links
 

1996 British television episodes
1990s historical films
1990s war films
Films based on British novels
Films based on historical novels
Films based on military novels
Napoleonic Wars films
Siege
War television films
Cultural depictions of Arthur Wellesley, 1st Duke of Wellington
Fiction set in 1813
Films directed by Tom Clegg (director)